Gerald Stairs "Gerry" Merrithew  (23 September 1931 – 5 September 2004), born in Saint John, New Brunswick, Canada, was an educator, provincial and federal politician, and statesman.

Merrithew graduated from the New Brunswick Teachers' College, then obtained his BA and B.Ed degrees from the University of New Brunswick.

With a lifelong interest in the Canadian Forces, he became an officer cadet and rose to the rank of lieutenant-colonel. As a high school principal, he was active not only in the educational field, but the military, recreational fields, as well as cultural affairs that led to his entering politics.

Provincial politics
First elected to the Saint John City Council in 1971 he went into provincial politics in 1972, winning a by-election for the Provincial Progressive Conservative Party. Re-elected to the Legislative Assembly in 1974, he would be appointed to the Cabinet as Minister of Education then in 1976, Minister of Commerce & Development. After winning re-election again in 1978 and in 1982, he became the Minister of Natural Resources,
Government House Leader, and Deputy Premier.

Federal politics
Gerald Merrithew resigned his provincial seat to run as a Progressive Conservative Party of Canada candidate for the Saint John riding in the 1984 Canadian federal election. Elected to the House of Commons of Canada in Ottawa, and with his party winning the election, Merrithew was immediately appointed Minister of State for Forestry then in 1986 to Forestry & Mines. After winning his seventh consecutive election in 1988, he was appointed Minister for the purpose of the Atlantic Canada Opportunities Agency and Minister of Veterans Affairs.

Retirement
In 1993, Merrithew resigned from Cabinet and did not seek re-election. He and his wife retired to their farm in Springfield, New Brunswick at the head of the Belleisle Bay.

Active with numerous Military and Veterans Associations, Merrithew was a member of the Queen's Privy Council for Canada and also held several directorships including the "26th Battalion Overseas Association Inc." where in 1995 he was instrumental in publishing the history of the Battalion by S. Douglas MacGowan.

Death
Gerald Merrithew died of cancer on 5 September 2004, aged 72.

Electoral history

References
 Hansard, 1st Session, 38th Parliament, Volume 142, Issue 16
 
 Legislative Assembly of New Brunswick tribute to Gerald Merrithew

1931 births
2004 deaths
Deaths from cancer in New Brunswick
Members of the Executive Council of New Brunswick
Members of the House of Commons of Canada from New Brunswick
Members of the King's Privy Council for Canada
Progressive Conservative Party of Canada MPs
Progressive Conservative Party of New Brunswick MLAs
Saint John, New Brunswick city councillors
Heads of schools in Canada
University of New Brunswick alumni
Members of the 24th Canadian Ministry